Force field may refer to:

Science
 Force field (chemistry), a set of parameter and equations for use in molecular mechanics simulations
 Force field (physics), a vector field indicating the forces exerted by one object on another
 Force field (technology), a barrier made up of energy, plasma or particles to protect a person, area or object from attacks or intrusions or as a means of containment or confinement
 Force field, a region in the spinal cord that causes limbs to exert a consistent force depending on the limbs' position
 Force-field analysis, a concept in the social sciences

Arts and entertainment
 Force Field (album), by the Atomic Bitchwax, 2017
 Forcefield (album), by Tokyo Police Club, 2014
 "Force Field", by Smash Mouth from Smash Mouth (album), 2001
 Forcefield (art collective), an American noise band and art collective
 Forcefield (band), a British hard rock band
 "Force Field", the theme tune of the British game show The Crystal Maze